The Yorkshire Board of the Gaelic Athletic Association (GAA) or Yorkshire GAA, is one of the county boards of the GAA outside Ireland, and is responsible for Gaelic games in Yorkshire. The county board is also responsible for the Yorkshire county teams.

Clubs
Football

 Brothers Pearse (Huddersfield)
 Cú Chulainn's GAC (Newcastle)
 Hugh O'Neills (Leeds)
 JFKs (Leeds)
 St Benedict's Harps (Leeds)
 St Vincent’s (Sheffield)
 Young Irelands (Leeds)
 York GAA (York)

Hurling

 Yorkshire Emeralds (Leeds)

Yorkshire Senior Football Championship

List of Finals

External links
 Official Provincial Council of Britain GAA website

British GAA
GAA
Gaelic games governing bodies in the United Kingdom